Caroline Springs railway station is located on the Serviceton line in Victoria, Australia. It serves the western Melbourne suburb of Ravenhall, and opened on 28 January 2017.

History
The Victorian Transport Plan, released in 2008, proposed the progressive upgrade of the Melton line, to support future urban development in the corridor. Construction of the station was to have commenced in 2010, and be completed in 2012.

After the 2010 State Election, the Baillieu Government put further construction on hold, with an access road to the site having been partially constructed. Construction of a bridge over the railway line had to be completed, to serve the nearby Boral quarry, which otherwise would have been isolated by the new Regional Rail Link line that runs north-south across it.

In May 2014, in the run-up to the 2014 State Election, the Napthine Government announced that construction would commence in 2014, with a scheduled 2016 completion date. Construction commenced in August 2015.

However, in May 2016, the Andrews Government made the decision to "future-proof" the station for the duplication of the Ballarat line, by redesigning the station with a second platform. As a result, the opening of the station was delayed until early 2017.

On 28 January 2017, the station was officially opened by the Member for Kororoit, Marlene Kairouz, during a community day, with the first services calling at the station the following day.

First announced by the Andrews State Government in 2018, the station is set to be integrated into the metropolitan railway network, as part of the Western Rail Plan.

As part of the Regional Rail Revival project, 18km of track was duplicated between Deer Park West and Melton. It was provided in late 2019, coinciding with the opening of Cobblebank.

Platforms and services
Caroline Springs station has one island platform with two faces. It is served by V/Line Ballarat and Ararat line trains.

Platform 1:
  services to Southern Cross
  services to Southern Cross

Platform 2:
  services to Melton, Bacchus Marsh and Wendouree
  services to Ararat

Transport links
Kastoria Bus Lines operates two routes via Caroline Springs station, under contract to Public Transport Victoria:
 : to Watergardens station
 : to Watergardens station

References

External links
 Rail Geelong gallery

Railway stations in Melbourne
Railway stations in Australia opened in 2017
Railway stations in the City of Melton